is a railway station in the town of Oguni, Yamagata Prefecture, Japan, operated by East Japan Railway Company (JR East).

Lines

Station layout
The station has one side platform serving a single bi-directional track. The station is unattended.

History
Isaryō Station opened on October 30, 1935. The station was absorbed into the JR East network upon the privatization of JNR on 1 April 1987. The current station building dates from December 1993.

Surrounding area

Isaryō Post Office

See also
List of Railway Stations in Japan

External links

 JR East Station information 

Railway stations in Yamagata Prefecture
Yonesaka Line
Railway stations in Japan opened in 1935
Stations of East Japan Railway Company
Oguni, Yamagata